Semyon Vladimirovich Melnikov (born 27 January 1985) is a Russian former professional footballer.

Club career
He made his debut in the Russian Premier League in 2007 for FC Luch-Energiya Vladivostok.

References

1985 births
Living people
Russian footballers
FC Luch Vladivostok players
Russian Premier League players
FC Vityaz Podolsk players
FC Zenit Saint Petersburg players
Association football forwards
FC Dynamo Saint Petersburg players
FC Novokuznetsk players